Roger Ewing Gill (October 14, 1940 — January 14, 1999) was an American football wide receiver and tight end who played in the American Football League and the National Football League. He played college football at Texas Tech.

Professional career
Gill was selected by the Philadelphia Eagles in the 12th round of the 1963 NFL Draft and by the San Diego Chargers in the 22nd round of the 1963 AFL Draft. In 1965, he caught one pass for 27 yards in 13 games played before suffering a season ending groin injury in December. After being released by the Eagles, Gill played minor league football for the San Antonio Toros in the Continental Football League and the Texas Football League. He was inducted into the Minor League Football Hall of Fame in 1986.

Post-playing career
Gill remained active in football in San Antionio after retiring as a player. He was the general manager of the San Antonio Gunslingers of the United States Football League.

References

1940 births
1999 deaths
Texas Tech Red Raiders football players
Players of American football from Texas
Philadelphia Eagles players